Bekkersdal is a township situated 7 km east of Westonaria and 14 km south of Randfontein in the Gauteng province. It was established in 1945, to house Africans who worked in town and at the surrounding gold mines. In 1983 the township was granted municipal status. The township was the site of violent protests ahead of the general elections on 7 May 2014.

References

Populated places in the Rand West City Local Municipality
Populated places established in 1945
Townships in Gauteng